Madurai East may refer to:
 Madurai East (state assembly constituency)
 Madurai East block, a revenue block in the Madurai district of Tamil Nadu, India
 Madurai East railway station